Lila Walter Evans is a former Republican member of the Montana House of Representatives, who represented District 16 from 2011 to 2013. She was defeated for re-election in 2012 by Lea Whitford, by a margin of 1,823 to 935.

References

Living people
Year of birth missing (living people)
Republican Party members of the Montana House of Representatives
People from Browning, Montana
Women state legislators in Montana
21st-century American women